Carolin Elisabeth Golubytskyi (née Wutz, born 19 December 1985 in Bad Mergentheim, Germany) is a German foil fencer.

Biography
Carolin Golubytskyi attended Riemenschneider-Realschule Tauberbischofsheim and the Kaufmännische Schule Tauberbischofsheim. Golubytskyi fought for the Fencing-Club Tauberbischofsheim. She is coached by her husband, Sergei Golubytskyi, a former world class fencer, 3 time consecutive World Champion, and Olympic silver medallist. Golubytskyi was part of the German team winning the bronze medal at the 2009 World Fencing Championships in Antalya, Turkey. She also won three medals at European Championships and participated in the 2008 Summer Olympics in Beijing.

She was nominated again to participate in the 2012 Summer Olympics in London. Golubytskyi won her first round bout against Colombian Saskia Garcia but was defeated in the round of 16 by Elisa Di Francisca of Italy, who would later win the gold medal. During the fight Di Francisca apparently hit Golubytskyi on the chin with the bellguard of her foil. After an interruption for several minutes, the German, who led the fight 8:6 at the time of the incident, was able to score only one further point and eventually lost 9:15.

References

External links

 
 
 
 
 

1985 births
Living people
German female fencers
Fencers at the 2008 Summer Olympics
Fencers at the 2012 Summer Olympics
Fencers at the 2016 Summer Olympics
Olympic fencers of Germany
German foil fencers
European Games competitors for Germany
Fencers at the 2015 European Games
People from Bad Mergentheim
Sportspeople from Stuttgart (region)
21st-century German women